The Tri-City Americans are a major junior ice hockey team of the Western Hockey League, based in Kennewick, Washington. The team plays its home games at Toyota Center. Every game is broadcast locally on the Tri-City Americans' flagship radio station 870 AM KFLD, and each game can also be heard streaming live at KFLD's UStream Channel, as well as occasionally being telecast on Saturday nights on KVEW 42.2. The Tri-City Americans have also been featured in the television series Z Nation episode "Day One".

History
The Tri-City Americans franchise is an original franchise of the WHL. They began in 1966 as the Calgary Buffaloes before being renamed the Centennials after one season. The franchise was also known as the Billings Bighorns from 1977 to 1982 before relocating to Nanaimo, British Columbia, as the Nanaimo Islanders. After one season, they moved to New Westminster, British Columbia, to become the second incarnation of the New Westminster Bruins. They moved to the Tri-Cities in 1988.

The Americans enjoyed local support until early 2000, the start of four owners in four years, all wanting to relocate the team to Canada. Between selling off team assets, lack of on-ice success, and one owner banning the local newspaper columnist from attending games, the attendance dropped considerably. Although the ownership group represented by Darryl Porter had stated upon purchasing the team that they would create a local presence (the oft-heard criticism of the ownership groups), Mr. Porter had still not moved to the Tri-Cities in his third year of ownership.  In 2004, Porter attempted to move the team to Chilliwack, British Columbia.  However, other Western Hockey League teams voted to prevent the move, including all four other American teams as well as two Canadian teams.  Shortly after this failure, the team was sold to Tri-Cities natives, including former Americans' players Olaf Kolzig, the former goalie for the Washington Capitals, and Stu Barnes of the Dallas Stars. Since the sale, the team has doubled attendance figures and won the first division championship in team history. Porter and his investment group were later granted the Chilliwack Bruins as an expansion franchise.

On November 29, 1989, Americans goaltender Olaf Kolzig became the first goalie to register a WHL goal when he successfully shot on an empty net against the Seattle Thunderbirds.

The Americans annual series with the Highway 395 rival Spokane Chiefs is always intense and full of action, clearly their biggest rival year in and year out.  The competitiveness of the two team is such that an annual tradition with the Americans is to play the Chiefs at home on New Year's Eve.  The only time this tradition was broken was due to a one-day strike by the Americans over the training tactics of one of the coaches.

In the 2002–03 season, sixteen-year-old goaltender Shannon Szabados became the first female player to compete in the WHL when she played one game for the Americans. In 2010, Szabados won gold in Women's Ice Hockey at the 2010 Winter Olympics playing for Canada.

During the 2007–08 WHL season, the Americans won the US Division regular season championship for the first time after a March 15, 2008, game against division rival Spokane Chiefs in Kennewick, Washington, at the Toyota Center.  The Americans won the Western Conference regular season championship, as well as the Scotty Munro Memorial Trophy for the best overall regular season record in the WHL. The 2009–10 season marked the third straight year the Americans won the US Division.

At their annual New Year's Eve game against the Spokane Chiefs on December 31, 2008, the Americans set a record for attendance at a hockey game in the Toyota Center, with 6,042 attendees. The Americans surpassed this number on March 13, 2010, in a game against Spokane, with an attendance of 6,053.

The Americans won the Western Conference championship for the first time in the 2010 playoffs defeating the Chilliwack Bruins, Kelowna Rockets, and Vancouver Giants in successive series before dropping the league championship to the Calgary Hitmen in five games.

Charitable work and events

The Americans are charitably-active in the Tri-Cities area.  Years ago, the Americans were one of the first teams to do 'The Teddy Bear Toss', which was originally called 'Toy Trick'.  This is where the fans would throw stuffed animals onto the rink on a selected night when the home team scores their first goal.  The players collect the bears and hand them out to various organizations or the players take them along with them when they visit children in the local hospitals.

A definite first at the Tri-City rink was the Breast Cancer night.  Brian Sandy, Senior VP of business operations and Chief Marketing Officer, dreamed up this event, where the ice is tinted pink and the players wear pink jerseys that are auctioned-off at the end of the night.  The game on February 2, 2008, every jersey sold for the maximum donation of $500 each, with all proceeds supporting breast cancer research.

The Americans also were active in raising start-up funds for the establishment of a local chapter of The First Tee.  Players visit schools and hospitals weekly and assist the young hockey players with their practices.  Links are provided on their website to other organizations like the local Humane Society, and opportunities have been provided to the Children's Developmental Center to volunteer to aid in the seating at games for a $15,000 check at the season's conclusion.

Season-by-season record
Note: GP = Games played, W = Wins, L = Losses, T = Ties OTL = Overtime losses Pts = Points, GF = Goals for, GA = Goals against

WHL Championship history
2009–10: Loss, 1–4 vs Calgary

Current roster
Updated January 24, 2023.

 

 
 
  
 
 
  

  

  
 
 
 
  

 
 

 

|}

Team records

NHL alumni

Carter Ashton
Stu Barnes
Milan Bartovic
Jake Bean
Shawn Belle
Alexandre Boikov
Brian Boucher
Jason Bowen
Brandon Carlo
Dylan Coghlan
Eric Comrie
Kimbi Daniels
Chris Driedger
Brad Ference
Brett Festerling
Dan Focht
Morgan Geekie
Scott Gomez
Patrick Holland
Olaf Kolzig
Zenith Komarniski
Jaroslav Kristek
Jason Labarbera
Daymond Langkow
Brett Leason
Scott Levins
Bill Lindsay
Jason Marshall
Josef Melichar
Steve Passmore
Stephen Peat
Alexander Pechurskiy
Ronald Petrovicky
Carey Price
Michael Rasmussen
Terry Ryan
Terran Sandwith
Jesse Schultz
Ray Schultz
Brendan Shinnimin
Todd Simpson
Dan Smith
Sheldon Souray
Clayton Stoner
Jaroslav Svejkovsky
Billy Tibbetts
Juuso Valimaki
Terry Virtue
Vladimir Vujtek
Tyler Weiman
B. J. Young

Retired numbers
8 - Brian Sakic
14 - Stu Barnes, Todd Klassen
33 - Olaf Kolzig

References

External links
Tri-City Americans website
Tri-City Herald coverage of Tri-City Americans
Tri-City Americans flagship radio station
Tri-City Americans celebrate 25 years | Tri-City Herald

Ice hockey teams in Washington (state)
Kennewick, Washington
Sports in the Tri-Cities, Washington
Western Hockey League teams
Ice hockey clubs established in 1988